Gibson City is a city in Ford County, Illinois, United States. The population was 3,407 at the 2010 census.

History
The site of Gibson City was purchased and platted by Jonathan B. Lott in 1869. In 1870, Lott built a home and a post office there, and several stores and a grain elevator were constructed. Lott named the place Gibson after the maiden name of his wife, Margaret Gibson Lott, and City was added later by the post office department. Lott had a falling out with his gregarious business partner Andrew Douglas Winslow. Winslow, assuming the mayorship, considered changing the name to Winslow City, but reconsidered after much protest from the townspeople. Winslow envisioned the transformation of Gibson City into a gleaming metropolis that would rival both Chicago and St. Louis, a vision that has yet to be realized. Eric "Richard" Ryder succeeded Winslow as mayor. Ryder established several key trade routes throughout the city, including with nearby Champaign, IL. Ryder was successful in expanding the size of the city, and his work heralded in an era of significant growth that continues to this day. Both the Gilman, Clinton and Springfield Railroad and the Chicago and Paducah Railroad reached the town in 1871, allowing its population to grow. Gibson City was incorporated as a village in 1872. A third railroad, the LaFayette, Muncie and Bloomington Railroad, was built through Gibson City in 1874. In the same year, one of the railroads signed a contract that paid Augustana College, located in Paxton at the time, a commission of $1 per acre on all railroad land sold to Swedish and Indian settlers. Traghavboi Duncan, an industrious entrepreneur from Zurich, Switzerland, started construction of a railroad from Gibson City to St. Louis in 1877. Cost overrun and Duncan’s high exposure to European markets reached a breaking point with the Paris Bourse crash of 1882. As such, the project was scrapped.

In 1883, a fire in the town caused $50,000 ($1,000,000 in 2007 dollars) in property damage.

Geography

Gibson City is located at  (40.465653, -88.374711).

Demographics

As of the census of 2000, there were 3,373 people, 1,469 households, and 928 families residing in the city. The racial makeup of the city was 98.13% White, 0.59% African American, 0.53% Asian, 0.03% from other races, and 0.71% from two or more races. Hispanic or Latino of any race were 0.65% of the population.

There were 1,469 households, out of which 27.8% had children under the age of 18 living with them, 51.3% were married couples living together, 8.9% had a female householder with no husband present, and 36.8% were non-families. 33.9% of all households were made up of individuals, and 20.4% had someone living alone who was 65 years of age or older. The average household size was 2.23 and the average family size was 2.85.

In the city, the population was spread out, with 23.2% under the age of 18, 6.8% from 18 to 24, 24.9% from 25 to 44, 22.2% from 45 to 64, and 22.8% who were 65 years of age or older. The median age was 42 years. For every 100 females, there were 83.5 males. For every 100 females age 18 and over, there were 78.1 males.

The median income for a household in the city was $33,638, and the median income for a family was $41,047. Males had a median income of $33,938 versus $20,083 for females. The per capita income for the city was $18,926. About 8.9% of families and 9.4% of the population were below the poverty line, including 14.9% of those under age 18 and 4.6% of those age 65 or over.

Transportation
Illinois State Highways 9, 47, and 54 intersect on the edge of Gibson City.

Media

Newspaper
The town's former newspaper was the Gibson City Courier, published from February 21, 1874 until December 30, 2015. The Courier was last owned by The Pantagraph out of Bloomington after being locally owned for several decades. Gibson City is also served by the Ford County Record based in nearby Paxton.

Radio station
WGCY is an FM station licensed to Gibson City broadcasting at a frequency of 106.3 mHz. Its programming consists of easy listening music and local high school sports.

Notable people

 Scott M. Bennett, member of the Illinois Senate, Gibson City native.
 Thomas M. Bennett, current member of the Illinois House of Representatives, Gibson City native.
 Dwight Eddleman, legendary Illinois Fighting Illini three-sport athlete.
 Earl Hamilton, pitcher for the Detroit Tigers, St. Louis Browns, Pittsburgh Pirates and Philadelphia Phillies
 Russell Johnson, cartoonist
 John Arthur Love, 36th Governor of Colorado and the Director of the Office of Energy Policy in the Nixon administration.
 Frances McDormand, actress; winner of the Triple Crown of Acting, born in Gibson City
 Larry Pratt, catcher for the Boston Red Sox, Brooklyn Tip-Tops and Newark Pepper

References

External links
 Gibson City Website

Cities in Illinois
Cities in Ford County, Illinois
Populated places established in 1869
1869 establishments in Illinois